Benjamin Thomas Jessome (born October 22, 1986) is a Canadian politician, who was elected to the Nova Scotia House of Assembly in the 2013 provincial election. A member of the Nova Scotia Liberal Party, he represents the electoral district of Hammonds Plains-Lucasville.

Early life and education 
Jessome attended Hammonds Plains Consolidated School, Madeline Symonds Middle School and Charles P. Allen High School. He graduated from Hebron Academy in 2006. In 2011, Jessome completed a bachelor's degree in recreation management from Acadia University. While at Acadia, Jessome was elected President of the Students' Union, was a member of the University Board of Governors and Senate, and represented the interests of his constituents to the provincial and national governments, as a delegate with the Alliance of Nova Scotia Student Associations (now Students Nova Scotia) and the Canadian Alliance of Student Associations.

Political career
In May 2013, Jessome successfully ran for the Liberal nomination in the riding of Hammonds Plains-Lucasville. He was elected in the 2013 provincial election. Currently Jessome is Vice Chair of the Private & Local Bills Committee. He is a member of the Veterans Affairs Committee. Jessome is also a member of the economic Development and Human Resources Committee, with a focus on Youth Employment strategies.

On February 23, 2021, Jessome was appointed to the Executive Council of Nova Scotia as Minister of the Public Service Commission.

Jessome was re-elected in the 2021 election, however the Rankin Liberals lost government becoming the Official Opposition.

Electoral record

|-

|Liberal
|Ben Jessome
|align="right"|3,402
|align="right"|52.24
|align="right"|N/A
|-

|New Democratic Party
|Peter Lund
|align="right"|1,583
|align="right"|24.31
|align="right"|N/A
|-

|Progressive Conservative
|Gina Byrne
|align="right"|1,423
|align="right"|21.85
|align="right"|N/A
|-

|}

References

1986 births
Living people
Nova Scotia Liberal Party MLAs
Members of the Executive Council of Nova Scotia
People from the Halifax Regional Municipality
21st-century Canadian politicians
Acadia University alumni